Dennis Martin Berran (October 8, 1887 – April 28, 1943) was an outfielder in Major League Baseball. He played for the Chicago White Sox in 1912.

References

External links

1887 births
1943 deaths
People from Merrimac, Massachusetts
Sportspeople from Essex County, Massachusetts
Major League Baseball outfielders
Chicago White Sox players
Danbury Hatters players
Baseball players from Massachusetts